The   was the third season of the nationwide fourth tier of Japanese football, and the 18th season since the establishment of Japan Football League.

Clubs
Sixteen clubs participated in this season of Japan Football League. The list was announced on 9 December 2015. A place for 2016 Emperor's Cup will be given to the winners of the first stage of the 2016 JFL.

Change in rules
The tournament continued with the system introduced in 2014: Two single round-robin stages are held, and winners of each stage determine the champion in the post-season home and away championship playoffs. If the same team manages to win both stages, no playoffs will be held, and they will be automatically declared champions.

The two worst performing teams by aggregated results of both stages are relegated to the Regional Leagues and replaced by the top two performers of the Regional League promotion series. However, if one or two teams are admitted to J3 or withdrawn at the end of the season, the number of relegated clubs are reduced accordingly.

According to updated J.League Terms, the clubs must comply the following requirements to be promoted to J3 League:
Play in JFL for at least one season before promotion
Hold a J.League 100 Year Plan club status
Finish in top 4 of the combined JFL table and finish either 1st or 2nd among associate members.
Have an average home attendance of at least 2,000; with significant effort recognized toward reaching 3,000 spectators
Have an annual operating revenue of 150 million yen
Pass the J3 licensing examination conducted by J.League

First stage

Second stage

Championship play-offs
The championship play-offs were held after the season between two winners of each stage. Ryutsu Keizai Dragons, the winners of the first stage, hosted the first leg on 26 November, and Honda FC who won the second stage hosted the second leg on 4 December.

|}

Overall table
This table is used to determine J3 promotion candidates. To qualify for promotion, a club must hold a 100 Year Plan status, obtain J3 license (marked in bold in the table), and finish both in the top 4 of the JFL, and either 1st or 2nd among the promotion-eligible clubs.

Top scorers 

Updated to games played on 13 November 2016.Source: JFL Stats & Data - Ranking:Goals

Attendance

Promotion from Regional Leagues
FC Imabari and Veertien Mie

References

External links
Official website

2016
4